Grasstree is a closed station on the Main North railway line in New South Wales.  It opened in 1877 and closed to passenger services in 1975 and was subsequently demolished. It consisted of a pair of side platforms at the site of a passing loop. No trace of the station now remains.

References 

Disused regional railway stations in New South Wales
Railway stations in the Hunter Region
Railway stations in Australia opened in 1877
Railway stations closed in 1975
Main North railway line, New South Wales